Leonard Kuypers (13 June 1899 – 4 August 1988) was a Dutch fencer. He competed in the team épée event at the 1928 Summer Olympics.

References

1899 births
1988 deaths
Dutch male fencers
Olympic fencers of the Netherlands
Fencers at the 1928 Summer Olympics
People from Bukittinggi
20th-century Dutch people